Argyresthia thuriferana is a moth of the family Yponomeutidae. It is found in France.

References

Moths described in 1992
Argyresthia
Moths of Europe